Floating Island is a 1930 children's novel written and illustrated by Anne Parrish. A China-doll family's shipwreck and adventure in the Floating Island are told in the novel in the simple and colloquial style .

Story

Once upon a time, a China-Doll family happily lives in a dollhouse in Toy Shop reading books and dancing "The Waltz of the Dolls" with the piano accompaniment of Mrs. Doll.

One day, Elizabeth's Uncle Henry purchases the dollhouse and the dolls for his niece, Elizabeth, and the dolls are wrapped, put inside a box, and sent to tropics where Elizabeth lives. En route, the dolls wreck on a ship, and finally they drift on an uninhabited tropical island, together with their dollhouse.

They gradually get adapted to the island. Getting familiar with the native animals, they explore all over the island with curiosity.

At the end of the story, Mrs. Doll proposes leaving Floating Island. All other dolls disagree with her, but they decide to leave there because "dolls need children, and children need dolls" said Mrs. Doll.
They raise a signal fire, and then one sailor sees the signal and finds the dollhouse, dolls, and a strange monkey wearing little green trousers.

The story doesn't tell the future of the dolls, but it is concluded by asking readers whether or not they have the doll and "If you think they are, will you tell me?"

Characters

Mr. Doll 
A fatherly doll with the shining black china hair.

Mrs. Doll
A motherly doll with the fuzzy and yellow hair.

William Doll
A boy doll with the brown china hair.

Annabel Doll
A girl doll with the long yellow hair and a white dress.

Baby Doll
A baby doll.

Dinah the Cook 
A housemaid of Doll family. Her china is black and lips seem full. At the end, unlike the other dolls she chooses to stay on Floating Island because she feels "as if this (island) was home".

Finny, Lobby, Chicky and Pudding 
Plaster friends of the family.

Sailor Joe
A sailor who found out the doll house and dolls on the Floating Island. No one on the ship Shooting Star believes what he saw in the Island.

Reception

The Horn Book Magazine described Floating Island as "... one of those books so whimsically compounded that its like happens rarely." and went on "There are many people who can write a fine story of adventure, history or everyday life, but how many can write an Alice or a Story of Dr. Dolittle? It is this last kind of book which Anne Parrish has made."

Awards
1931 Newbery Honor

References

1930 American novels
American children's novels
Newbery Honor-winning works
Novels set on islands
Sentient toys in fiction
Fictional floating islands
1930 children's books